Ron Garwasiuk (born February 17, 1949) is a Canadian retired professional ice hockey player. He played one season of major league hockey with the Los Angeles Sharks of the World Hockey Association (WHA).

Garwasiuk played junior hockey with the Regina Pats, and he led the Pats to win the 1969 Abbott Cup by scoring a team record 63 points in 28 play-off games.

Selected by the Detroit Red Wings in the 2nd round (21st overall) of the 1969 NHL Entry Draft, Garwasiuk began his professional career in 1969 with the Fort Worth Wings of the Central Hockey League - the minor league affiliate for the Detroit Red Wings.

Garwasiuk played 51 games of major league hockey during the 1973–74 season with the Los Angeles Sharks of the WHA, and the next six seasons in the American Hockey League (AHL) as a member of the Rochester Americans before retiring as a player following the 1979–80 AHL season.

In 1992 Garwasiuk was inducted into the Rochester Americans Hall of Fame.

Awards and honours

References

External links

1976 births
Living people
Canadian ice hockey left wingers
Canadian people of Ukrainian descent
Detroit Red Wings draft picks
Fort Worth Wings players
Ice hockey people from Alberta
Johnstown Chiefs players
Los Angeles Sharks players
People from the County of St. Paul No. 19
Providence Reds players
Regina Pats players
Rochester Americans players
Canadian expatriate ice hockey players in the United States